The 1990 New Mexico Lobos football team was an American football team that represented the University of New Mexico in the Western Athletic Conference (WAC) during the 1990 NCAA Division I-A football season.  In their fourth season under head coach Mike Sheppard, the Lobos compiled a 2–10 record (1–6 against WAC opponents) and were outscored by a total of 400 to 279. 

The team's statistical leaders included Jeremy Leach with 2,428 passing yards, Aaron Givens with 546 rushing yards, Eric Morgan with 1,043 receiving yards, and kicker David Margolis with 67 points scored.

Schedule

References

New Mexico
New Mexico Lobos football seasons
New Mexico Lobos football